In phonetics, a continuant is a speech sound produced without a complete closure in the oral cavity, namely fricatives, approximants, vowels, and trills. While vowels are included in continuants, the term is often reserved for consonant sounds. Approximants were traditionally called "frictionless continuants".  Continuants contrast with occlusives, such as plosives, affricates and nasals.

Compare sonorant (resonant), which includes vowels, approximants and nasals but not fricatives, and contrasts with obstruent.

See also
 List of phonetics topics
 Schwa
 Spectromorphology

References

Phonetics